Özge Akın (née Gürler, born June 17, 1985) is a Turkish sprinter competing in the 400 m events. She is the current Turkish record holder of the 400 m hurdles events. Following her marriage to her coach, her surname changed to Akın, although she was also subsequently known by the surname Akın-Gürler.

Competing initially in the long jump and running sprint and middle distance, she specialized in 400 m and 400 m hurdles following her coach's recommendation. Özge Gürler was a member of İzmir Gençlik sports club, Anadolu University, Ankara MTA and İzmir Metropolitan Municipality sports club before she transferred to Enkaspor in Istanbul. She studied Physical Education and Sports at the Ege University in Izmir.

Özge Gürler participated at the 2005 Mediterranean Games in Almería, Spain in the 4 × 100 m relay, 400 m hurdles and 4 × 400 m relay events. She ran bronze medal with her teammates Birsen Bekgöz, Pınar Saka and Binnaz Uslu in 4 × 400 m relay.

She was admitted to the Turkey's national athletic team at the 2008 Beijing Olympics for the 400 m hurdles despite an injury at her foot. However, since her injury could not be cured out completely, she did not show at the competition's final run.

Özge Akın qualified for participation in the 4 × 400 m relay event at the 2012 Summer Olympics. She won a silver medal in the 4 × 400 m relay event with her teammates Birsen Engin, Esma Aydemir and Sema Apak as well as a bronze medal in the 400 m hurdles event at the 2013 Islamic Solidarity Games held in Palembang, Indonesia.

Achievements

References

External links
 

1985 births
Living people
People from Akhisar
Enkaspor athletes
Turkish female sprinters
Ege University alumni
Turkish female hurdlers
Olympic athletes of Turkey
Athletes (track and field) at the 2012 Summer Olympics
Mediterranean Games bronze medalists for Turkey
Athletes (track and field) at the 2005 Mediterranean Games
Sportspeople from Manisa
Mediterranean Games medalists in athletics
Competitors at the 2013 Summer Universiade
Competitors at the 2005 Summer Universiade
Islamic Solidarity Games competitors for Turkey
20th-century Turkish sportswomen
21st-century Turkish sportswomen